Victor M. Dabney is an American politician. He is a former member of the South Carolina House of Representatives from the 52nd District, serving since 2020. He is a member of the Republican party.

References

Living people
Republican Party members of the South Carolina House of Representatives
21st-century American politicians
People from Sumter, South Carolina
1958 births